The Het were the people of the northern Patagonian pampas west of the Paraná River: The Chechehet, the Diuihet or Didiuhet, and the Taluhet. The easternmost Didiuhet, near modern Buenos Aires and influenced by the Guarani, were called the Querandí (see). It is not clear if these three peoples were related linguistically or only culturally.

The Het were neighbored on the north by the Chaná, on the northwest and west by the Mapuche, and on the south by the Puelche.

Peoples
The Het peoples are listed from north to south as follows.
The Taluhet occupied the modern provinces of San Luis in the east, Córdoba, and Santa Fe in the west.
The Diuihet (Divihet, Didiuhet, Diliuhet) inhabited the coastal region between the La Plata and Paraná rivers in Buenos Aires Province,  southern Santa Fe, and inland through La Pampa and as far as Mendoza.
The Chechehet lived as far south as the mouths of the Colorado and Río Negro rivers in southern Buenos Aires Province.

Language 
The Het population was decimated by the end of the eighteenth century by epidemics, which facilitated the Mapuche absorption of its territory and its survivors rapid Araucanization at the cultural level that consolidated them into the Puelche.  For this reason it is today difficult to find evidence of the Het languages. Of Querandí (Diuihet) we only have two sentences and a few words, recorded by French sailors around 1555. Based on this admittedly inadequate data, Viegas Barros showed that Querandí may have been closely related to Puelche. Viegas Barros (2005) further attempted to demonstrate that Puelche is more distantly related to the Chon languages to its south.

Loukotka (1968) lists the following basic vocabulary items for Chechehet and Querandí.

{| class="wikitable"
! gloss !! Chechehet !! Querandí
|-
! two
| chivil || 
|-
! moon
|  || zobá
|-
! earth
| chu || 
|-
! bow
|  || afia
|-
! great
| hati || 
|}

References

Languages of Argentina
Chonan languages
Indigenous peoples of the Southern Cone
Indigenous peoples in Argentina
Languages extinct in the 19th century
Unclassified languages of South America